Anthony J. Vella is a judge of the family court in Malta, and a former magistrate on the magisterial inquiry into the assassination of Daphne Caruana Galizia.

Early life and education
Anthony J. Vella was born in 1965 and received his early education at Stella Maris School and St. Aloysius College. He subsequently studied law at the University of Malta. Between 1988 and 1990 he was the Students of Law Association's president and he represented law students on the Faculty of Law Board. He graduated as Doctor of Law in 1991. In 1997 he gained a bachelor's degree in philosophy and theology and two years later earned a master's degree in financial services.

Career
Vella was sworn in as magistrate by President Guido de Marco in 2004. He was working on the magisterial inquiry into the assassination of Daphne Caruana Galizia prior to being promoted to judge in 2018. His swearing-in ceremony featured in The Malta Independent, in which he was reported to state "the importance of not only listening to but paying attention to what children had to say in family court cases, whilst taking care to ensure that what they say is not coming from an adult."

According to the Times of Malta he is a household name in Malta.

See also
Judiciary of Malta

References 

Living people
20th-century Maltese judges
21st-century Maltese judges
Year of birth missing (living people)